Flax elachista is a moth of the family Erebidae. It was described by David Stephen Fletcher in 1957. It is found on Rennell Island in the Solomon Islands.

The wingspan is about 9 mm. The forewings are light brown, with brown subterminal and terminal areas. The base of the costa, and all of the medial area are also brown. The crosslines are indistinct and light brown. The subterminal line is brown and the terminal line is only indicated by dark-brown interveinal dots. The hindwings are light grey. The underside of the forewings is unicolorous brown and the underside of the hindwings is grey with a discal spot.

References

Micronoctuini
Moths described in 1957